Ivica Milutinović (Serbian Cyrillic: Ивица Милутиновић; born October 20, 1983) is a Serbian footballer.

External links
 

1983 births
Living people
Sportspeople from Mitrovica, Kosovo
Serbian footballers
Serbian expatriate footballers
FK Mladi Obilić players
FK Banat Zrenjanin players
FK Obilić players
Ethnikos Achna FC players
FK BSK Borča players
FK Borac Čačak players
Expatriate footballers in Cyprus
Serbian SuperLiga players
Cypriot First Division players
Association football defenders